HD 66428 is a G-type main sequence star located approximately 174 light-years away in the constellation of Monoceros. This star is similar to the Sun with an apparent magnitude of 8.25, an effective temperature of 5705 ± 27 K and a solar luminosity 1.28.
Its absolute magnitude is 11.1 while its U-V color index is 0.71. It is considered an inactive star and it is metal-rich ([Fe/H] = 0.310).
This star has a precise mass of 1.14552 solar masses. This precision comes from the Corot mission that measured asteroseismology.

Planetary system
In July 2006, the discovery of the extrasolar planet HD 66428 b was published in the Astrophysical Journal. It was found from observations at the W. M. Keck Observatory using the radial velocity method. It has a minimum mass of more than 3 times that of Jupiter and orbits at a distance of 3.47 AU away from the star.

In 2015 a refined orbit was determined which led to the discovery of a linear trend in the radial velocities indicating a more distant companion of unknown character, which was determined to be a gas giant planet HD 66428 c or brown dwarf in 2021. In 2022, the inclination and true mass of both planets were measured via astrometry. The orbital period and mass of planet c were found to be significantly lower than the previous higher-error estimates, showing it to be planetary mass and not a brown dwarf.

See also
 List of extrasolar planets

References

External links
 

G-type main-sequence stars
066428
039417
Monoceros (constellation)
Planetary systems with two confirmed planets
Durchmusterung objects